Motomura (written: 本村) is a Japanese surname. Notable people with the surname include:

, Japanese tennis player
Hiroshi Motomura (born 1953), American legal scholar and writer
, Japanese communist

Japanese-language surnames